The Knox County Courthouse is a historic building in Center, Nebraska, the county seat of Knox County.

After a series of five elections to determine a county seat, Center — located on two corn fields in the geographic center of the county — was selected in 1901 as the county seat. A first courthouse was built in 1902. The current courthouse was constructed from February to October 1934. In addition to $50,000 raised by the county from tax levies, the courthouse was the first public building in Nebraska to be built using funds and workers from the Civil Works Administration and Federal Emergency Relief Administration.

On July 5, 1990, the Courthouse was added to the National Register of Historic Places.

References

External links

Historic districts on the National Register of Historic Places in Nebraska
Buildings and structures in Knox County, Nebraska
Courthouses on the National Register of Historic Places in Nebraska
County courthouses in Nebraska
Historic American Buildings Survey in Nebraska
National Register of Historic Places in Knox County, Nebraska
Civil Works Administration
Government buildings completed in 1934
New Deal in Nebraska